Zac Nsenga (born 1958) was the Rwandan ambassador to the United States from 2003 to 2007.

He studied and graduated from Makerere University Medical school with a degree in human medicine and the University of Westminster with an MA in diplomatic studies and a certificate in strategic studies.

He has been ambassador to the State of Israel, the United Kingdom, Ireland, Norway, Sweden, Denmark  and now the US with concurrent accreditation to Brazil, Mexico and Argentina as well as the Bretton Woods institutions.

He is an endorser of the Genocide Intervention Network, pressing for more U.S. action on the genocide in Darfur.

References

External links
 

Rwandan diplomats
1958 births
Living people
Makerere University alumni
Ambassadors of Rwanda to the United States
Ambassadors of Rwanda to Israel
Ambassadors of Rwanda to the United Kingdom
Ambassadors of Rwanda to Ireland
Ambassadors of Rwanda to Norway
Ambassadors of Rwanda to Sweden
Ambassadors of Rwanda to Denmark
Ambassadors of Rwanda to Brazil
Ambassadors of Rwanda to Mexico
Ambassadors of Rwanda to Argentina